

This is a list of the National Register of Historic Places listings in Valdez–Cordova Census Area, Alaska.

This is intended to be a complete list of the properties and districts on the National Register of Historic Places in Valdez-Cordova Census Area, Alaska, United States. The locations of National Register properties and districts for which the latitude and longitude coordinates are included below, may be seen in a Google map.

There are 28 properties and districts listed on the National Register in the census area, including 3 National Historic Landmarks.  Another two properties were once listed but have been removed.

Current listings 

|}

Former listings

|}

See also 

 List of National Historic Landmarks in Alaska
 National Register of Historic Places listings in Alaska

References 

Valdez-Cordova